Stanisław Jan Gucwa (18 April 1919 – 14 August 1994) was a Polish politician and economist. He was the Marshal of the Sejm from 1972 until 1985.

Biography 
Gucwa was born in Przybysławice. During World War II, he participated in the Polish resistance movement under the pseudonyms Golec and Socha.

In 1949, he joined the United People's Party. He was a member of the Sejm from 1961 until 1989 and the Marshal of the Sejm from 1972 until 1985.

In 1974, Gucwa received the Order of the Builders of People's Poland. He also received the Order of the Banner of Work First Class and the Order of Polonia Restituta Third Class.

References 

1919 births
1994 deaths
People from Tarnów County
Members of the Polish Sejm 1961–1965
Members of the Polish Sejm 1965–1969
Members of the Polish Sejm 1969–1972
Members of the Polish Sejm 1972–1976
Members of the Polish Sejm 1976–1980
Members of the Polish Sejm 1980–1985
Members of the Polish Sejm 1985–1989
20th-century Polish economists
United People's Party (Poland) politicians
Marshals of the Sejm
Polish resistance members of World War II